Arthur Richardson may refer to:
Arthur Richardson (Australian cricketer) (1888–1973), Australian Test cricketer
Arthur Richardson (politician) (1860–1936), British Member of Parliament for Nottingham South and Rotherham
Arthur Richardson (footballer, born 1880) (1880–1951), Australian rules footballer for St Kilda
Arthur Richardson (footballer, born 1913) (1913–1993), English football centre forward
Arthur Richardson (footballer, born 1928) (1928–2001), Australian rules footballer for South Melbourne
Arthur Charles Jeston Richardson (1872–1939), Australian cyclist and mining engineer, first man to circumnavigate Australia on a bicycle
Arthur Herbert Lindsay Richardson (1872–1932), Canadian recipient of the Victoria Cross
Arthur R. Richardson (1862–1936), pilot, farmer and political figure in Nova Scotia, Canada
Arthur Walker Richardson (1907–1983), English cricketer